David Jacoby is a former ESPN broadcaster and producer. He was the senior producer on the TV show The Grantland Basketball Hour as well as the show It's The Shoes.  He was a host on the TV show Jalen & Jacoby on ESPN and ESPN radio and a co-host of the Ringer Food podcast with Juliet Litman.

References 

Living people
Year of birth missing (living people)
American television sports anchors
Place of birth missing (living people)